Rehana is a village and one of the 44 union councils, administrative subdivisions, of Haripur District in the Khyber Pakhtunkhwa province of Pakistan.

The largest village in the union council is Rehana village itself, which is renowned for being the birth- and resting place of Field Marshal Muhammad Ayub Khan and Sardar Bahadur Khan.  It remains the home village of his family, which includes political figures like Gohar Ayub Khan, Yousuf Ayub Khan and Omar Ayub Khan. The indigenous tribe is Tareen. Rehana has etymological origin in Arabic word for flower of Paradise

References 

Union councils of Haripur District